The Unraveling of PUPTheBand (stylized in all caps) is the fourth album by Canadian punk rock band PUP, released on April 1, 2022, through Rise Records and Little Dipper, the band's personal label. The album will be accompanied by the Canadian, American, and European tour PUP Returns. The album's cover artwork was illustrated by Jordan Speer.

Background 
PUP released their third studio album, Morbid Stuff on April 5, 2019 via Little Dipper and Rise Records. During the COVID-19 pandemic, all scheduled events were interrupted, and the band released the EP This Place Sucks Ass on October 23, 2020.

Single "Waiting/Kill Something" was released on November 9, 2021, with "Waiting" set to be the seventh track on the album. The band announced The Unraveling of PUPTheBand alongside the single release of "Robot Writes a Love Song" on January 18, 2022. "Matilda" was released on March 1, 2022, one month before the album release. The album's fourth single, "Totally Fine", was released on March 22, 2022 along with a music video which showcases the band being put on trial.

Their first show since the start of the pandemic took place on March 23, 2022 in Toronto.

The album was longlisted for the 2022 Polaris Music Prize.

Track listing

Personnel
PUP
 Stefan Babcock – lead vocals, rhythm guitar
 Zack Mykula – drums, backing vocals, percussion
 Steve Sladkowski – lead guitar, backing vocals
 Nestor Chumak – bass, backing vocals

Technical
 Peter Katis – production, recording, mixing
 Greg Calbi – mastering
 Greg Giorgio – recording
 Kurt Leon – additional recording
 Erik Paulson – assistant engineering
 Jake Gray – assistant engineering

Additional musicians
 Thomas Bartlett – additional keyboards
 Peter Katis – additional keyboards
 Sarah Tudzin – additional vocals on "Relentless"
 Melanie Gail St-Pierre – additional vocals on "Totally Fine"
 Kathryn McCaughey – additional vocals on "Waiting"
 Erik Paulson – additional vocals on "Cutting Off the Corners" and "Grim Reaping"
 Marie Goudy – trumpet on "Four Chords" and "Grim Reaping"
 Paul Tarussov – trombone on "Grim Reaping"
 Colin Fisher – saxophone on "PUPTheBand Inc. Is Filing for Bankruptcy"

Charts

References 

PUP (band) albums
2022 albums
Rise Records albums